Alexander Pitcairn (1750 – 17 November 1814) was an English cricketer who played in nine first-class matches in 1791 and 1792.

Pitcairn was born in 1750 and educated at Harrow School. He made his first-class debut for an MCC side against a Middlesex XI at Lord's Old Ground in May 1791. After playing in two more first-class matches during the year, he played in six in 1792. Five of Pitcairn's nine matches were for MCC sides; he also played for the Gentlemen of England, Gentlemen of Kent, a Hampshire XI and a team organised by Thomas Assheton Smith. In total he scored 152 first-class runs, with a highest score of 34.

Pitcairn died at Eynsford, Kent in 1814.

Notes

English cricketers
1750 births
1814 deaths
Hampshire cricketers
Marylebone Cricket Club cricketers
English cricketers of 1787 to 1825
Gentlemen of Kent cricketers
Gentlemen of England cricketers
People from Eynsford